A list of films produced in Brazil in 2009 (see 2009 in film):

2009

See also
2009 in Brazil
2009 in Brazilian television
List of 2009 box office number-one films in Brazil

References

2009
Films
Brazil